The Association of Family Case Workers (AFCW), known as the Association of General and Family Case Workers from 1954 to 1963, was the main professional body for social workers looking after the welfare of families in the United Kingdom from 1940 to 1970.

In 1970 the association merged with six other social workers' organisations to form the British Association of Social Workers, having been a member of the Standing Conference of Organisations of Social Workers since 1962.

References
 John B. Smethurst, Peter Carter, "Historical Directory of Trade Unions: Including Unions In, Building and Construction, Agriculture, Fishing, Chemicals, Wood and Woodworking, Transport, Engineering and Metal Working, ...", Historical Directory of Trade Unions vol 6, Ashgate Publishing, Ltd., 2009, p. 424

External links
Catalogue of the AFCW archives, held at the Modern Records Centre, University of Warwick

Social work organisations in the United Kingdom
Child-related organisations in the United Kingdom
Organizations established in 1940
Organizations disestablished in 1970